The Democratic and Socialist Union of the Resistance ( or UDSR) was a French political party founded after the liberation of France from German occupation and mainly active during the Fourth Republic (1947–58). It was a loosely organised "cadre party" without mass membership. Its ideology was vague, including a broad diversity of different political convictions with descriptions ranging from left-wing via centrist to conservative. It was decidedly anti-communist and linked with the Paix et Liberté ("Peace and Liberty") movement. The UDSR was a founding member of the Liberal International in 1947.

Foundation 
It was founded in 1945 by the non-Communist majority of the resistance network, Movement of National Liberation. The project was to create a French labour party with all the former non-Communist Resistance. However, this plan failed because of the rebirth of the French Section of the Workers' International (SFIO) and the emergence of the new Christian-Democratic party Popular Republican Movement (MRP) and then of the Gaullist party, Rally of the French People (RPF). Henceforth, the UDSR associated itself with the Radical Party, who had been in government during most of the Third Republic, in the Rally of the Republican Lefts (Rassemblement des gauches républicaines or RGR), which presented itself as an alternative to the tripartisme alliance between the SFIO, the MRP and the French Communist Party (PCF).

Fourth Republic 
Following the May 1947 crisis during which Maurice Thorez, Communist vice-premier, and four other PCF ministers left Paul Ramadier's government, the UDSR took part in the Third Force coalition which gathered the centre-left and centre-right parties to face with the oppositions of the PCF on the one hand, and of the RPF on the other. It remained throughout the Fourth Republic a minor centrist political party which participated to the governments. Its president René Pleven was named president of the Council from 1951 to 1952, before being succeeded by Antoine Pinay (National Centre of Independents and Peasants, CNIP). But Pleven's leadership was eventually challenged by François Mitterrand who advocated a realignment to the Left, and took the lead in 1953.

In 1956 the UDSR participated in the centre-left coalition Republican Front, headed by Pierre Mendès-France, which won the legislative election. However, two years later, the UDSR imploded. Indeed, Pleven and the conservative wing approved Charles de Gaulle's come back during the May 1958 crisis, in the midst of the Algerian War and threats of a coup d'état, and the institutions of the Fifth Republic, contrary to Mitterrand who called the new Constitution a "permanent coup d'état."

Legacy 
The UDSR survived until 1964, when it merged into Mitterrand's Convention of Republican Institutions (CIR), which itself merged at the 1971 Epinay Congress into the new Socialist Party (PS), which until 2017 was the main left-wing party in France.

See also 
French Fourth Republic

References 

Defunct political parties in France
French Fourth Republic
Political parties in France
1945 establishments in France
Political parties established in 1945
1964 disestablishments in France
Political parties disestablished in 1964